Switzerland is a nation that has competed at the Hopman Cup tournament on twelve occasions, the first being at the third annual staging in 1991. It won the tournament in 1992, 2001, 2018, and 2019, and was also runners-up in 1996.

Players
This is a list of players who have played for Switzerland in the Hopman Cup.

Results

1 In the 1996 final versus Croatia, the Swiss team was forced to retire from the mixed doubles with the score at 5–5 in the final set, thus handing the championship to Croatia. This was due to a hand injury sustained by the Swiss player, Marc Rosset, when he punched the backboard in frustration at having not taken match points.
2 In 1997, a back injury prevented Marc Rosset from competing in his singles matches in the ties against both Romania and South Africa as well as the mixed doubles against South Africa.

References

Hopman Cup teams
Hopman Cup
Hopman Cup